is a Japanese footballer currently playing as a defensive midfielder for FC Tokyo, in J1 League.

Career statistics

Club
.

Notes

Honours

Club
FC Tokyo
J.League Cup: 2020

References

External links

1997 births
Living people
Association football people from Tokyo
Meiji University alumni
Japanese footballers
Association football midfielders
J1 League players
J3 League players
FC Tokyo players
FC Tokyo U-23 players